Yohan Roche (born 7 July 1997) is a professional footballer who plays as a defender for Turkish club Adanaspor. Born in France, he represents the Benin national team.

Club career
Roche permanently joined Rodez AF on 20 June 2019, after a successful year-long loan with them from Stade de Reims. He made his professional debut with Rodez in a 2–0 Ligue 2 win over AJ Auxerre, on 26 July 2019.

International career
Roche was born in France to a French father and Beninese mother. He debuted with the Benin national team in a friendly 2-0 win over Gabon on 12 October 2020.

References

External links
 
 

 

1997 births
Black French sportspeople
Living people
Footballers from Lyon
Citizens of Benin through descent
Beninese footballers
Benin international footballers
French footballers
Beninese people of French descent
French sportspeople of Beninese descent
Association football defenders
Rodez AF players
Adanaspor footballers
Ligue 2 players
Championnat National players
Championnat National 2 players
Championnat National 3 players
TFF First League players
Beninese expatriate footballers
Expatriate footballers in Turkey
Beninese expatriate sportspeople in Turkey